Kalenga is a genus of moths of the family Thyrididae.

This genus is known from Africa.

Species
Some species of this genus are:
Kalenga ansorgei (Warren, 1899)
Kalenga culanota Whalley, 1971
Kalenga maculanota Whalley, 1971

References

Thyrididae
Moth genera